The Viação Itapemirim S.A. was a Brazilian passenger road transport company. It was founded on July 4, 1953, in the Cachoeiro de Itapemirim, Espírito Santo, Brazil. It was the largest road passenger transport business in Brazil and Latin America. 

Due to financial difficulties and scandals involving the diversion of funds from the judicial reorganization to create ITA Transportes Aéreos, the company had a bankruptcy decree in court on September 21, 2022, after EXM Partners, responsible for the company's judicial reorganization, reported not having more chances for the group to recover financially.

Structure
Viação Itapemirim is a group of companies operating in various sectors such as:
 Complex Pindobas (agricultural)
 Itabira (graphics and marketing)
 Network Flecha (Hotels and restaurants)
 Marbrasa (mining)
 Fiat Cola and Samadisa (vehicles and parts)
 MC Massad Cola (marketing and communication)
 Itabira (insurance)
 Sossai (Toyota vehicles and parts)

References

External links
 Official website

Bus companies of Brazil
2022 disestablishments in Brazil